"That's the Way Love Is" is a 1967 Tamla (Motown) single recorded by The Isley Brothers and produced by Norman Whitfield.

Marvin Gaye recording
The single was later covered in a 1969 hit version by Marvin Gaye.  It was his third consecutive million-selling solo hit after "I Heard It Through the Grapevine" and "Too Busy Thinking About My Baby" written by Whitfield and Barrett Strong. Whitfield took the up-tempo Isley Brothers record, and turned it into a slowed-down psychedelic soul opus. Like "Grapevine", Gaye delivers the song in an emotionally wrought fashion, approaching a preacher-like tone through which he tells a woman to "forget" her lover now that the lover has gone off to someone else.

Chart performance
The song peaked at #7 on the Billboard pop singles chart and held the #2 spot for five weeks on the soul singles chart in October 1969 (it was held off by The Temptations' "I Can't Get Next To You"), eventually selling a million copies.

Personnel
Isley Brothers version
 Lead vocals by Ronald Isley
 Background vocals by O'Kelly Isley Jr., Rudolph Isley and The Andantes: Jackie Hicks, Marlene Barrow and Louvain Demps
 Instrumentation by The Funk Brothers

Marvin Gaye version
 Lead Vocals by Marvin Gaye
 Background Vocals by The Andantes: Jackie Hicks, Marlene Barrow and Louvain Demps
 Instrumentation by The Funk Brothers

Temptations version
 Lead vocals by Dennis Edwards and Paul Williams
 Background vocals by Eddie Kendricks, Melvin Franklin, Paul Williams, and Otis Williams
 Instrumentation by The Funk Brothers

The Commitments version
 Lead vocals by Imelda Quirke (Angeline Ball)
 Background vocals by Natalie Murphy (Maria Doyle) and Bernie McGloughlin (Bronagh Gallagher)
 Instrumentation by The Commitments

Cover versions
The Temptations, as a B-side of "Psychedelic Shack" and released on their 1969 album Puzzle People.
The 1991 Alan Parker film The Commitments.
Performed at Live Aid by Paul Young and Alison Moyet.

References

1967 singles
1969 singles
Songs written by Barrett Strong
Songs written by Norman Whitfield
Marvin Gaye songs
Motown singles
The Isley Brothers songs
The Temptations songs
Psychedelic soul songs
1967 songs
Song recordings produced by Norman Whitfield
Tamla Records singles